Najib Daho (13 January 1959, Larache, Morocco – 29 August 1993, Morocco) was an English Commonwealth lightweight champion, and British super-featherweight champion boxer.

Career

Daho's career is said to have begun when Najib was a child fighting for money in a small market square in Larache, Morocco, where he was known as the "Cåsbah." After moving to Manchester, England, he decided to develop his talent at a local boxing gym where he was scouted by Jack Trickett, soon after becoming an amateur boxer.

In 1986, Daho became British super-featherweight champion, and then he became Commonwealth Lightweight Champion in 1989. He retired soon after achieving the commonwealth at the age of 32.

In August 1993, Daho died in a traffic collision while visiting Morocco.

Daho is known for his first-round knockout to favorite Pat Cowdell.

References

1959 births
1993 deaths
Lightweight boxers
Super-featherweight boxers
English people of Moroccan descent
People from Larache
Moroccan male boxers
Road incident deaths in Morocco
British male boxers
Moroccan emigrants to England